Schieffelin Gulch is a valley in the U.S. state of Oregon.

Schieffelin Gulch was named in 1895 after one Clinton Schieffelin.

References

Landforms of Jackson County, Oregon
Valleys of Oregon